General elections were held in South Africa on 8 May 2019 to elect a new President, National Assembly and provincial legislatures in each province. These were the sixth elections held since the end of apartheid in 1994 and determined who would become the next President of South Africa.

Incumbent President Cyril Ramaphosa led the ruling African National Congress, with the party attempting to retain its majority status and secure Ramaphosa a full term in office as president; his predecessor, Jacob Zuma, resigned from office on 14 February 2018. Zuma was already ineligible for a third term in office as the South African Constitution limits a president to serve a maximum of two five-year terms.

The National Assembly election was won by the ruling African National Congress (ANC), but with a reduced majority of 57.50%, down from 62.15% in the 2014 election. This was also the ANC's lowest vote share since the election after the end of apartheid in 1994 where they won 62.65% of the total vote share. The official opposition Democratic Alliance (DA) declined from 22.23% to 20.77%, while the Economic Freedom Fighters (EFF) significantly grew, going from 6.35% to 10.80%. The Inkatha Freedom Party (IFP) grew from 2.40% to 3.38%, this was the first time the party grew since 1994. The Freedom Front Plus (FF+) also grew from 0.9% to 2.38%, which is its highest vote share since its founding.

Eight of the nine provincial legislatures were won by the ANC, though it lost its two-thirds majority in the National Council of Provinces for the first time since 1994. The EFF retained its position as official opposition in Limpopo and the North West, while simultaneously beating the Democratic Alliance to second place in Mpumalanga. The DA obtained the second place in four provinces won by the ANC. In KwaZulu-Natal, the Inkatha Freedom Party beat the DA to second place for the first time since 2014 and grew to 3.38% on the national level. In the Western Cape, the only province not won by the ANC, the DA declined from 59.38% to 55.45%.

Electoral system 
South Africa has a parliamentary system of government; the National Assembly consists of 400 members elected by closed list proportional representation. Two hundred members are elected from national party lists; the other 200 are elected from provincial party lists in each of the nine provinces. The 200 provincial seats are divided among the provinces based on population, ranging from 5 seats in the Northern Cape to 48 seats in Gauteng, as of this election. The largest remainder method and the Droop quota are used to allocate seats at both the provincial and national level. All 400 seats are first allocated to parties at the national level, then the 200 provincial seats are allocated to parties in each of the nine provinces. Finally, the national list seats are allocated to the parties by subtracting seats won at the provincial level for each party from that party's national allocation, generating a maximally proportional result. A provision in the electoral law limits the number of seats allocated in the highest remainder stage of the national allocation to 5, with any remaining unallocated seats distributed according to the highest average of votes per seat. The President of South Africa is elected by the National Assembly after the election.

The provincial legislatures, which vary in size from 30 to 80 members, are also elected by proportional representation with closed lists, using the same method as the provincial allocation in the national election. The premiers of each province are elected by the respective provincial legislatures.

The National Council of Provinces (NCOP) consists of 90 members, ten elected by each provincial legislature. The NCOP members are elected by the provincial legislatures in proportion to the party makeup of the legislatures.

Date of election 
The term of the National Assembly is five years. The previous general election was held on 7 May 2014, and the term of the National Assembly therefore ended on 6 May 2019, but the National Assembly remained competent to function from the time it is dissolved, or its term expires, until the day before the first day of polling for the next National Assembly.

When the National Assembly's term expires (or if it is dissolved), the President must call and set dates for an election, which must be held within 90 days of the date the National Assembly was dissolved or its term expired. Therefore, if the National Assembly had not been dissolved before 6 May 2019, the election had to be held by 4 August 2019. A proclamation calling and setting dates for an election may be issued before or after the expiry of the term of the National Assembly.

On 7 February 2019, while President Cyril Ramaphosa was delivering the annual State of the Nation Address before Parliament, he announced that national and provincial elections would be held on Wednesday, 8 May 2019. This was confirmed in the official proclamation of the election date, made on 26 February 2019, which also closed the voters' roll.

Voter registration

Local voters 
On the weekends of 10–11 March 2018 and 26–27 January 2019, all voting stations were opened for new voters to register and for those who moved residence to re-register in their new voting district. All South African political parties launched voter registration campaigns. Politicians especially urged the youth to register to vote. Following the January 2019 registration, the commission announced that over 700,000 new voters had registered over the January registration weekend. This brought the combined total of new voters to over 1.1 million and the total number of voters on the voters' roll to 26,727,921.

International voters 
Voter registrations for all South Africans living abroad took place from 1 to 4 February 2019. The registration took place during the office hours at all of South Africa's 120 diplomatic missions. On 14 March 2019, the Independent Electoral Commission confirmed that 30,532 South African voters abroad applied to be included in the election, of which 29,334 applications were approved.

Contesting political parties 

The governing African National Congress (ANC) has held a majority of the seats in the National Assembly since 1994, being re-elected with increasing majorities in 1999 and 2004, and with a slight fall in its majority in 2009 and 2014. The ANC is led by Cyril Ramaphosa, who was elected to a five-year term as President of the African National Congress, beating his rival, Nkosazana Dlamini-Zuma, by a narrow margin. David Mabuza was elected as Deputy President of the ANC, succeeding Ramaphosa.

On 14 February 2018, Zuma resigned as President of South Africa, leading Ramaphosa, as Deputy President, to succeed him as acting president and serve out the remainder of Zuma's term. Ramaphosa was elected president on 15 February 2018. Ramaphosa thus ran for a full term in office as president.

The official opposition Democratic Alliance (DA) was led by Helen Zille. She announced on 12 April 2015, that she was not running for re-election.
Leader of the Opposition Mmusi Maimane and Federal Chairperson Wilmot James were seen as prominent front-runners.

At the party's 2015 Federal Congress in Port Elizabeth, Maimane was elected leader of the DA, succeeding outgoing leader Helen Zille. He defeated Wilmot James, winning close to 90% of the vote. He was backed by prominent businessman and future Johannesburg mayor Herman Mashaba. He became the first black South African to lead the DA, as well as its youngest leader to date. In the 2016 municipal elections, the party contested the municipal elections for the first time under the leadership of Mmusi Maimane. The party gained significant support and control of municipalities all across South Africa while assuming control of most Western Cape councils. In addition, the party gained three metropolitan municipalities from the ANC – Tshwane, Johannesburg and Nelson Mandela Bay. The party did increase its majority in Cape Town. They lost control of the Nelson Mandela Bay municipality in August 2018, after a vote of no confidence ousted the DA administration. The DA held its Federal Congress on 7–8 April 2018 in Pretoria. Mmusi Maimane was re-elected unopposed as the leader for another term.

The Economic Freedom Fighters (EFF) is a splinter party of the ANC that was formed in July 2013 by expelled ANC Youth League leader, Julius Malema, taking a strong anti-ANC position within its far-left economic platform, such as calling for the expropriation of land without compensation, and the nationalisation of South Africa's mines and the South African Reserve Bank. The party contested its first general elections in 2014 and garnered support across South Africa, giving it a total of 25 seats in the National Assembly.

The Inkatha Freedom Party (IFP) was led by Mangosuthu Buthelezi. The party's support has decreased since 2004 due to internal party disputes. The party gained municipalities and support in its stronghold of KwaZulu-Natal in the 2016 municipal elections. This election would be Buthelezi's last election as party president, as he announced on 20 January 2019 that he would not seek re-election to another term. The party launched its manifesto on 10 March 2019. The party elected Velenkosini Hlabisa as Buthelezi's successor.

The National Freedom Party (NFP) was formed in 2011 by disgruntled IFP members. It was launched on 25 January 2011 by Zanele kaMagwaza-Msibi, former chairperson of the Inkatha Freedom Party (IFP). The party made gains on the IFP in 2014 but lost support in 2016. The party launched its manifesto on 31 March 2019.

Since 2004, the party's support has increased but has maintained a small presence in parliament by securing no more than four seats in the National Assembly since the 2004 general election. According to the party's manifesto: "The Freedom Front Plus is irrevocably committed to the realisation of communities', in particular, the Afrikaner's, internationally recognised right to self-determination, territorial or otherwise; the maintenance, protection and promotion of their rights and interests, as well as the promotion of the right of self-determination of any other community, bound by a common language and cultural heritage in South Africa." The party launched its manifesto on 2 March 2019.

The Electoral Commission of South Africa (IEC) announced on 20 March 2019 that a record number of 48 parties had registered candidates for the national parliamentary election. This is 19 more parties that contested the 2014 national elections. In the provincial legislature elections, the total number of parties that registered candidates were:
Eastern Cape – 26
Free State – 28
Gauteng – 36
KwaZulu-Natal – 31
Limpopo – 34
Mpumalanga – 28
Northern Cape – 21
North West – 29
Western Cape – 34

The electoral code of conduct was signed at the Gallagher Convention Centre in Midrand, Gauteng on 20 March 2019. At the signing event, a draw was held in which the African Security Congress won the right to appear at the top of the ballot paper.

Notable new parties that contested the elections include:
Black First Land First (BLF) is a controversial far-left black nationalist political party. The party is headed by its founder and expelled EFF member, Andile Mngxitama. Mngxitama was expelled from the EFF in April 2015 and subsequently lost his National Assembly membership. He founded the party in October 2015, along with other disgruntled EFF members. The party's leaders and its members have been criticised and condemned for making racially insensitive comments that call for the killing of white South Africans. The party launched its manifesto on 6 April 2019.
Disgruntled former ANC Member of Parliament, Makhosi Khoza, founded the political party African Democratic Change (ADeC) in December 2017. She announced in April 2018 that she was retiring from politics. She later resigned from OUTA in March 2019.
Patricia de Lille, former Mayor of Cape Town and DA member, formed the political party Good in December 2018. The party is registered with the Electoral Commission of South Africa and contested the 2019 elections. The party launched its manifesto on 5 February 2019.
On 13 December 2018, former SABC Chief Operating Officer Hlaudi Motsoeneng joined the country's political landscape and launched a new political group named the African Content Movement (ACM). The party launched its manifesto on 6 April 2019.
The African Transformation Movement (ATM) is a political party that was formed in October 2018. It is led by Vuyolwethu Zungula. Former Eastern Cape Democratic Alliance Provincial Chairperson Veliswa Mvenya defected to the party and became the party's Provincial Chairperson of the party.
The Capitalist Party of South Africa (ZACP) is a political party that was launched on 17 March 2018.  It was founded by ten people who describe themselves as "positive disruptors" and who believe that innovative thinking could find solutions to many of South Africa's problems. The new political party has a purple cow as its logo.
The Land Party is led by Gcobani Ndzongana. The party grew out of land access and housing protests in Zwelihle, Hermanus in 2018. The party launched its manifesto on 21 March 2019.

National 
The IEC announced on 20 March 2019 that the following parties would contest the national ballot:

Provincial-only 
The following parties contested at provincial level only:

Party defections 
Former Mayor of Cape Town, Patricia de Lille, resigned from the Democratic Alliance on 31 October 2018. Various City of Cape Town councillors resigned along with her, including Mayoral Committee Member for Transport, Brett Herron, and City of Cape Town Chief Whip, Shaun August. De Lille has since formed a new political party named Good.

On 30 December 2018, former DA Western Cape MPP and special advisor to the Minister of Police Bheki Cele, Lennit Max, announced his resignation from the Democratic Alliance and subsequently joined the ANC. The DA had allegedly pressured Max to resign as a party member when he was appointed special advisor in July 2018.

The United Democratic Movement welcomed former Deputy Party President of the NFP, Sindi Maphumulo-Mashinini, to the party on 2 February 2019.

On 17 February 2019, African National Congress Member of Parliament, Dr Zukile Luyenge, resigned from the ANC and consequently joined the African Transformation Movement. Luyenge was a member of the ANC for thirty years and was elected MP in 2009. The Office of the ANC Chief Whip in the National Assembly confirmed the resignation.

On 2 March 2019, four Eastern Cape Democratic Alliance members resigned from the party and joined the African Transformation Movement. All of the ex-DA members had previously served as municipal councillors. On the same day, ANC, DA and EFF party t-shirts were burnt by defectors to the Minority Front at the party's manifesto launch.

Former Eastern Cape ANC Transport MEC, Thandiswa Marawu, defected to the African Transformation Movement on 11 March 2019.

On 13 March 2019, it was announced that former Provincial Leader of the Democratic Alliance in KwaZulu-Natal, Sizwe Mchunu, and several DA Msunduzi Local Municipality councillors, defected to the African National Congress. National Freedom Party MPL, Njabulo Mlaba, also defected to the ANC.

Former Eastern Cape Provincial Chairperson of the Economic Freedom Fighters, Themba Wele, defected to the African Transformation Movement on 15 March 2019.

On 26 March 2019, former ANC MP Vytjie Mentor announced that she was joining the African Christian Democratic Party.

Issues

Corruption 
Corruption within the government and government-owned enterprises was a significant electoral issue with all three of the largest parties campaigning on the issue. The ANC promised to fight corruption within the government and its own party whilst also controversially claiming that it had set up the Zondo Commission of Inquiry into state capture.

The DA wanted to impose a standard 15-year jail sentence for anyone caught committing corruption and establish a new anti-corruption unit in the National Prosecuting Authority to investigate politicians and government officials involved in misconduct. The EFF proposed amending the constitution to make the National Prosecuting Authority accountable to Parliament, rather than the National Government.

Land reform 
Land reform was also a major campaign issue that the three largest political parties campaigned on.  The ANC pledged to accelerate redistribution through expropriation in a way that will not negatively impact food security. The EFF campaign for state ownership over all land and the abolition of rents whilst the DA campaigned to strengthen property rights but at the same time implementing a land-reform program that increases access to land ownership. The Freedom Front Plus (FF+) and Congress of the People (COPE) and many other parties are strongly opposed to land expropriation without compensation. COPE and AfriForum have since formed a partnership in their opposition to the controversial policy.

Economic growth 
The ANC announced that it would be making economic growth and reducing unemployment the party's main campaign issues during the election. A particular focus for the ANC was on youth unemployment with a promise to create 275,000 new jobs a year for five years and attract R1.2 trillion in investment. Other parties also focused on job creation with the DA promising economic reforms to encourage growth and promoting the growth of small businesses. DA Federal Leader Mmusi Maimane advocated for a job in every household, whilst the EFF promised special economic zones to attract foreign investment.

Crime 

A number of parties campaigned on the issue of crime and how to deal with it.  The ANC pledged to strengthen the police force through better training and recruiting more officers whilst also focusing on dealing with gender-based violence. The DA advocated for the creation and strengthening of local level police forces instead of existing government policy focusing on the national level South African Police Service. The EFF promised harsher sentences for offenders and to greatly expand the police force.

The Inkatha Freedom Party (IFP), African Covenant and the African Transformation Movement (ATM) campaigned for the return of the death penalty.

Electricity crisis 

Rolling electricity blackouts caused by long-running and ongoing problems resulting from mismanagement and corruption at the state utility Eskom was an election issue that the Democratic Alliance campaigned on against the incumbent ANC. Mmusi Maimane and the Democratic Alliance Western Cape Premier candidate, Alan Winde, campaigned for the Western Cape to procure its electricity supply from Independent Power Producers (IPPs). ANC President Cyril Ramaphosa said that South Africa would overcome the electricity crisis.

Events

Durban xenophobic riots 

On 25 March 2019 in the run-up to the election xenophobic riots targeting African immigrants broke out in Durban resulting in the deaths of three people and the looting of foreign-owned stores. A speech given by President Cyril Ramaphosa at the ANC's election manifesto launch in the area two months prior where Ramaphosa committed to cracking down on undocumented foreigners involved in criminal activities was blamed for contributing to xenophobic feeling. The riots and the xenophobic feeling was condemned by political parties and the government.

National service delivery protests 

In early April 2019, a number of service delivery protests took place in Alexandra and Tshwane. The protests were supported by the trade union SAFTU who called on other areas in the province to join the protests. On 11 April 2019, the protests spread to areas of other major cities in the rest of the country. The DA and EFF accused the ANC of instigating the Alexandra protests as an election tactic in the runup to the election in May whilst the ANC accused the DA of not effectively delivering services to the protesting communities. The DA made a counter-accusation that it was ANC governance in these areas two years before was the root cause of poor service delivery in Alexandra.

Accusations of Russian influence 
Just before the election was concluded accusations of Russian influence operations in the elections were published in the South African media.  The Daily Maverick and Guardian newspapers reported that Putin associate Yevgeny Prigozhin worked to increase support for the ANC and undermine support for the DA and EFF. The Daily Maverick and Dossier Center report stated that Russian political analysis worked "under the auspices of Afric and the International Anti-Crisis Center" to conduct an influence-buying and disinformation campaign. The Russian embassy in South Africa denied the accusation and stated that the accusation does "not stand [up to] basic scrutiny."

Voting

International special votes 
Over 29,300 South Africans registered to participate in the national election in the international voting phase, which took place at 120 international voting stations on 27 April 2019. The overseas ballots were counted along with the domestic votes on 8 May 2019.

Special votes 
The local special vote phase of the election took place from 6 to 7 May 2019, accommodating South Africans who are physically infirm, disabled or pregnant or are unable to vote at their voting station on the polling day. The registration for special votes took place from 4 to 18 April 2019. More than 770,000 voters had registered for special votes. Archbishop Emeritus Desmond Tutu and his wife Leah cast their special votes on 6 May.

Voting day 
Voting took place relatively smoothly at 22,925 voting stations in South Africa. Voting stations opened at 7:00. By 11:30, the IEC announced that 17 voting stations had not opened, of which 14 were located in the KwaZulu-Natal. A total of 5 voting stations were not operational on voting day. The Commission blamed ongoing community unrest for the derailing of election operations. Voting stations closed and counting began at 21:00.

Incidents 
Nineteen people were arrested for allegedly "double voting" in three KwaZulu-Natal municipalities. It is still unclear whether a twentieth person has been arrested.

An elderly woman died on voting day while trying to cast her ballot. The Gauteng African National Congress sent their condolences. An Eastern Cape deputy presiding officer also died.

Indelible ink 
During the election there was some controversy over the quality of indelible ink used to mark voters and prevent double voting.  It was reported by some voters that the ink was easily removed shortly after voting, leading to questions around the quality of the ink used. An IEC investigation following the elections concluded that there were "negligible risks" to the election and its results caused by this event.

Opinion polls

Results

Parliament

National Assembly

National Council of Provinces 
After the elections of 8 May 2019, the new provincial legislatures met on 22 May to elect NCOP delegations. The delegations elected are described in the following table.

Provincial legislatures

Eastern Cape

Free State

Gauteng

KwaZulu-Natal

Limpopo

Mpumalanga

Northern Cape

North West

Western Cape

Aftermath

Party leadership 
The African National Congress (ANC) announced its parliamentary leadership candidates on 20 May 2019. The party announced that outgoing National Council of Provinces Chairperson, Thandi Modise, would succeed Baleka Mbete as Speaker of the National Assembly. Amos Masondo was named the new Chairperson of National Council of the Provinces. Controversial ANC politician, Nomvula Mokonyane, was named as the party's candidate for the post of Chair of Committees, but she withdrew her name prior to the first sitting of the new National Assembly. Outgoing Speaker of the National Assembly Baleka Mbete and former ANC MP Malusi Gigaba declined their seats.

After the elections, it was speculated that the Democratic Alliance (DA) would dismiss its leader, Mmusi Maimane, due to the party's decline in the polls. When asked about the speculations, the DA Federal Council Chairperson James Selfe said "that will be up to the party to decide." The following week, the party's Federal Chairperson Athol Trollip, after in consultation with the Federal Executive members, announced that Maimane could remain leader until the next DA Federal Congress. Maimane resigned from the party on 24 October 2019. John Steenhuisen was elected his interim successor on 17 November 2019. Senior Freedom Front Plus member Philip van Staden stated that his party benefited considerably in the election due to the Maimane's positions on race and ethnic identity resulting in the alienation of many white voters.

The Congress of the People (COPE), who had a dismal showing and further declined in this election, was rumoured to be planning a motion of no confidence in its leader, Mosiuoa Lekota, to effectively dismiss him over the party's partnership with controversial AfriForum. The party quickly rubbished the claims, stating that it has full confidence in its leader.

The Inkatha Freedom Party (IFP) held its elective conference in August 2019 to elect a new leader for the first time in its history as chief Mangosuthu Buthelezi stepped down after 44 years at the helm. The conference elected former mayor and current leader of the opposition in the KwaZulu-Natal Legislature, Velenkosini Hlabisa, as his successor.

Swearing-in of MPs and MPLs 
The National Assembly and all nine provincial legislatures reconvened on 22 May 2019, while the National Council of Provinces reconvened on the following day, 23 May 2019.

On 22 May 2019, the National Assembly reconvened, Chief Justice Mogoeng presided over the swearing-in of MPs and the election of the Speaker of the National Assembly. Former NCOP Chairperson Thandi Modise of the African National Congress (ANC) was elected Speaker. Modise defeated the Democratic Alliance's candidate Richard Majola, by a margin of 250 votes to only 83 votes for Majola. Modise presided over the Deputy Speaker's election. Incumbent Deputy Speaker Solomon Lechesa Tsenoli of the ANC was re-elected unopposed. The Chief Justice then presided over the election of the President. Incumbent President Cyril Ramaphosa of the ANC was re-elected unopposed. After the election, Ramaphosa immediately ceased to be a Member of Parliament.

The first sitting of the National Council of Provinces was held on 23 May 2019. Permanent delegates were sworn in and a chairperson, deputy chairperson, House Chairpersons and Chief Whip were elected. Former Mayor of Johannesburg Amos Masondo was elected Chairperson of the National Council of Provinces, while former Northern Cape Premier Sylvia Lucas was elected deputy chairperson. ANC Chief Whip Seiso Mohai was re-elected.

Presidential inauguration and government formation 
The official presidential inauguration took place on 25 May 2019. Chief Justice Mogoeng Mogoeng swore President-elect Cyril Ramaphosa in for his full-term as Executive President. The inauguration was the first to be held at the Loftus Versfeld Stadium in Pretoria, and not at the Union Buildings. The Union Buildings had been the official venue of the presidential inauguration since the country's first democratically elected president, Nelson Mandela, took the oath of office in 1994.

Shortly after, on 29 May 2019, Ramaphosa announced his new cabinet. The restructured cabinet has been reduced from 36 to only 28 ministries and includes former Gauteng Finance MEC Barbara Creecy, Good Party Leader Patricia de Lille and former Mayor of Johannesburg Parks Tau. Fourteen ministers were not reappointed to this cabinet. Notable outgoing ministers included Jeff Radebe, Bathabile Dlamini, Nomaindia Mfeketo and Tokozile Xasa. The newly appointed ministers were officially sworn in on 30 May 2019. In the following days, multiple former ministers resigned their seats in the National Assembly.

Further reading 

 Lieberman, Evan. 2022. Until We Have Won Our Liberty: South Africa after Apartheid. Princeton University Press.

References 

General election
General elections in South Africa
South African general election
South Africa